Đồng Văn is a township and capital of Đồng Văn District, Hà Giang Province, Vietnam.

References

Populated places in Hà Giang province
District capitals in Vietnam
Townships in Vietnam